Théo Stendebach (born 20 April 1937) is a Luxembourgian footballer. He played in 13 matches for the Luxembourg national football team from 1959 to 1971.

References

1937 births
Living people
Luxembourgian footballers
Luxembourg international footballers
Place of birth missing (living people)
Association footballers not categorized by position